Charm is an unincorporated community in northwestern Clark Township, Holmes County, Ohio, United States.  It has a post office with the ZIP code 44617.  It lies along State Route 557.

History
The origin of the name "Charm" is obscure.

Baby Swiss cheese was developed in the mid-1960s outside of Charm, Ohio, by the Guggisberg Cheese Company, owned by Alfred Guggisberg.

References

Unincorporated communities in Ohio
Unincorporated communities in Holmes County, Ohio